Periboeum maculatum is a species of beetle in the family Cerambycidae. It was described by Magno in 1987.

References

Elaphidiini
Beetles described in 1987